NTM may refer to:

Medicine and Science
 Neural Turing machine, a recurrent neural network model
 Nondeterministic Turing machine, a theoretical model of computation
 Nontuberculous mycobacteria, a class of bacteria
 NTM (gene), which encodes the protein neurotrimin

Organisations
 National Taiwan Museum, a museum in Taipei, Taiwan
 National Technical Museum (Prague), an institution in the Czech Republic
 National Theatre Movement, in Victoria, Australia
 National Transformation Movement, two political parties in Trinidad and Tobago
 National Translation Mission, an Indian initiative to make texts accessible
 Neil Thomas Ministries, a Christian organization
 Network Television Marketing, a television station in Pakistan
 New Tribes Mission, now Ethnos360, a Christian mission in Sanford, Florida, USA

Other
 Miracema do Tocantins Airport (IATA: NTM), Brazil
 Nateni language (by ISO 639 code)
 Non-tariff measures, a type of barrier to trade
 Notice to mariners, a navigational safety publication
 Suprême NTM, a French hip-hop duo